Sermorelin acetate (brand names Geref, Gerel), also known as GHRH (1-29), is a peptide analogue of growth hormone-releasing hormone (GHRH) which is used as a diagnostic agent to assess growth hormone (GH) secretion for the purpose of diagnosing growth hormone deficiency. It is a 29-amino acid polypeptide representing the 1–29 fragment from endogenous human GHRH, thought to be the shortest fully functional fragment of GHRH.

See also
 List of growth hormone secretagogues

References

Growth hormone secretagogues
Growth hormone-releasing hormone receptor agonists
Peptides
World Anti-Doping Agency prohibited substances